Northwestern Hotel may refer to:

Northwestern Hotel (Des Moines, Iowa), listed on the National Register of Historic Places in Polk County, Iowa
Northwestern Hotel (Waukesha, Wisconsin), listed on the National Register of Historic Places in Waukesha County, Wisconsin